Karate competitions at the 2015 Pan American Games in Toronto, Canada were held from July 23 to 25 at the Hershey Centre (Mississauga Sports Centre) in Mississauga. Due to naming rights the arena was known as the latter for the duration of the games. The competition was held under the kumite discipline, with men and women each competing in five events each. A total of 80 athletes from 14 nations took part.

Competition schedule

The following was the competition schedule for the karate competitions:

Medal table

Medalists

Men's events

Women's events

Participating nations
A total of 14 countries qualified athletes. The number of athletes a nation entered is in parentheses beside the name of the country.

Qualification

A total of 80 karatekas qualified to compete at the games (eight per weight category). There will be four qualification events for athletes to qualify, and the host nation, Canada, automatically qualified in each of the ten weight categories. A nation may enter a maximum of one athlete per weight category.

References

 
Events at the 2015 Pan American Games
Pan American Games
2015